Dawson City: Frozen Time is a 2016 American documentary film written, edited, and directed by Bill Morrison, produced by Morrison and Madeleine Molyneaux. First screened in the Orizzonti competition section at the 73rd Venice International Film Festival, the film details the history of the remote Yukon town of Dawson City, from the Klondike Gold Rush to the 1978 Dawson Film Find: a discovery of 533 nitrate reels containing numerous lost films. The recovered silent films, buried beneath a hockey rink in 1929, included shorts, features, and newsreel footage of various events, such as the 1919 World Series.

Synopsis
The 1978 discovery of 533 reels of nitrate film beneath the permafrost of a decommissioned swimming pool, later known as the Dawson Film Find, serves to frame a narrative of the Canadian gold rush, the dawn of 20th century America, and Hollywood in the silent era.

Contents of the unearthed reels help portray the story of Dawson City: how native lands of the Trʼondëk Hwëchʼin became a frontier, a boomtown, and an entertainment hub, before industrial monopolies and poverty of resources ensued. The 1957 documentary City of Gold captured Dawson in the shadow of its former glory.

The film utilizes a number of silent film techniques, consistent with the subject matter, including intertitles in place of voice-over narration, as well as archival sound and a prominent musical score. Brief interviews with those who saved the reels have a more contemporary documentary style.

Themes 
The film begins with a description of the dangers of flammable nitrate film. This offers some insight into the fragility of the cinematic medium, the archive, and perhaps history itself. The story of Dawson City is repeatedly framed in terms of loss, with decay foregrounded by the introduction, the brooding score, and the story itself. The film also focuses on the history of exploitation in Dawson City, implying a parallel between the economic apparatus of the Klondike Gold Rush and that of the motion picture industry.

Production 
Bill Morrison had initially envisioned the project to be similar to his 12-minute film The Film of Her (1996), but came to envision a broader scope as time went on. Kathy Jones and Michael Gates, employees of the Dawson Museum and Parks Canada respectively, were two of the early authorities on the Dawson City Film Find. Morrison interviewed both in 2014. Originally he did not intend to include the interview in the final film. Morrison was able to recruit Alex Somers as composer after learning that the band Sigur Ros were fans of his previous film Decasia.

Critical response
Dawson City: Frozen Time has received positive reviews from critics. Rotten Tomatoes reports a 100% approval rating based on 62 reviews, with a weighted average of 8.10/10. The site's consensus reads: "Dawson City: Frozen Time takes a patient look at the past through long-lost film footage that reveals much more than glimpses at life through the camera's lens". Dawson City: Frozen Time appeared on more than 100 critics' lists of the best films of 2017, and on numerous lists of the best films of the 2010s, including those from the Associated Press, Los Angeles Times (Kenneth Turan), and Vanity Fair (Richard Lawson). Kenneth Turan of the Los Angeles Times wrote, "If you love film, if you’re intoxicated by the way movies combine image and emotion, be prepared to swoon." Deborah Eisenberg, writing in the New York Review of Books, summarized: "Dawson City: Frozen Time is nominally a documentary—it is a documentary—but describing it as a documentary is something like describing Ulysses as a travel guide to Dublin. The film is transfixing, an utterly singular compound of the bizarre, the richly informative, the thrilling, the horrifying, the goofy, the tragic, and the flat-out gorgeous." Glenn Kenny of The New York Times praised the film "as an instantaneously recognizable masterpiece."

References

External links

Official trailer on YouTube
Trailer on Vimeo

2016 films
2016 documentary films
Collage film
American documentary films
Documentary films about the cinema of Canada
Documentary films about films
Films scored by Alex Somers
Films directed by Bill Morrison (director)
Film preservation
Silent film
Dawson City
2010s English-language films
2010s American films